Tennis Club de Paris (Tennis Club of Paris), also known as the TCP, is a tennis club founded in 1895 in Paris.

History

1895 to 1930 
In 1895, a few sportsmen, including Armand Masson and Paul Lecaron, had the idea of creating a tennis club that would bring together covered parquet courts and open clay courts.

These first founding members of the TCP, who were also patrons, financed the rental of a piece of land located at the corner of rue de Civry (at no. 2) and boulevard Exelmans and extending as far as boulevard Murat, halfway between Porte d'Auteuil and Porte de Saint Cloud, by means of shares at a nominal rate of 5,000 francs. They had just formed the Société Anonyme Immobilière du Tennis Club de Paris. In association with the owner of the land, they also financed the construction of 4 covered parquet courts and 5 open clay courts. In compensation for their financing, the first founding members were admitted as lif

e members of the TCP. But legal disputes ensued as the club's financial balance was precarious.

The TCP was the cradle of French tennis. Before the First World War, the champions of the time: Aymé, Vacherot, Gobert, Decugis, played at the TCP. Then we saw: Canet, Decugis, Germot, Gobert, Laurents. The four famous musketeers: Jean Borotra, Jacques Brugnon, Henri Cochet, René Lacoste. And in contemporary times, many French first series players.

In 1923, the TCP adopted the law of 1901 and became the Association Sportive du Tennis Club de Paris, tenant of the SA Immobilière du TCP. Albert Canet was the first President of the TCP as an Association under the 1901 law. He later became President of the French Lawn Tennis Federation.

1930 to 1945 
In 1930, on the death of his friend Albert Canet, Jean Borotra took over the presidency of the TCP, which then had about 1000 members. The lease on the rue de Civry had not been renewed. It was then that from 1934 onwards, Jean Borotra, helped by Georges Glasser, Gabriel Guy, Pierre Candeliez, efficient members of the Committee and Robert Foulon, Secretary of the French Lawn Tennis Federation, undertook to convince the Government, the City of Paris and the Sports Federations of the need to build, with the collaboration of the TCP, a large multisports stadium such as did not exist in Europe. This operation, carried out with the collaboration of the State, the City of Paris, the TCP itself, and the 1937 Exhibition, could be realised and in 1938 the TCP moved into new premises.

It was therefore necessary to appeal to new founding members to finance the complete fitting out of the new TCP. The payment was 15,000 francs and each founding member was entitled to all the benefits of the club for 20 years, i.e. until 1958 (at that time, the active membership fee was 1,500 francs per year with the benefits that still exist today: balls, lights, hut, towels). Thanks to this technical and financial effort, the TCP signed a 50-year lease with the City of Paris in 1937. These facilities, in great demand in the capital, were fully used by all the sports federations in covered halls. The complex included: The part that took the name of "Stade Pierre-de-Coubertin" and which was administered by the city with: A large covered stadium with 4000 seats and another small stadium with about 800 seats; a second small stadium was to be built later. The part rented to the TCP with a large hall with 6 covered wooden courts, a fitness room and, of course, all the lounges, restaurants, luxuriously furnished changing rooms and ancillary facilities necessary for the life of a large club. The TCP itself had built 8 clay courts (six of which were unfortunately separated by the Avenue Georges Lafont). The operation proved to be perfectly balanced in 1938 and 1939 and the greatest winter sports events were played there: the French International Championships, the Paris-London Meeting, etc. and the King Gustav V of Sweden Cup, created by Jean Borotra and the TCP for this occasion.

From September 1939 to May 1940, the TCP lived a "slow" life under the attentive leadership of Robert Foulon. During the very long years of occupation, the TCP gradually resumed a certain activity, albeit moderate, until September 15, 1943, the date of the last bombing of Paris, when an American squadron, charged with crushing Renault's "O" factory located on the Ile Seguin, used for the assembly of German tanks, succeeded perfectly, but without being able to avoid splattering the "Stade de Coubertin - TCP" complex, which was completely crushed by 12 bombs of 500 kilos. In 30 seconds, the life of the club was stopped.

1945 to 1965 
At the end of the war, Pierre Candeliez, President of the TCP, with the help of his Committee and the vigorous support of the French Lawn Tennis Federation, did everything possible to obtain the reconstruction of this sports complex from the City of Paris.

The combined and sustained efforts of the competent departments of the city (compensation for war damage, etc.), the Federation and the TCP finally obtained satisfaction despite enormous difficulties of all kinds, and gradually, first the open courts, then the covered courts, and finally the large stadium, were returned to their original form.

On the other hand, the construction of the ancillary facilities was significantly delayed; the difficulties associated with this period did not allow it to be carried out again with the same splendour as in 1937, but it nevertheless met the expectations of the members. Naturally, the TCP alone had to face the task of repairing its installations and interior fittings.

In order to collect the necessary funds, Jean Borotra, with all his titles and 6 Davis Cup victories under his belt, organised and carried out major trips around the world in 1947: the United States, Black Africa and Asia. This initiative was very well received everywhere and renowned players immediately collaborated with enthusiasm and dedication. Among them, we should mention Robert Abdesselam, Marcel Bernard, Jacques Brugnon, Henri Cochet, Bernard Destremau, and his teammates Roger Dubuc and Gil de Kermadec.

The return of the Tennis Club de Paris with the provision of the new covered courts coincided by a happy coincidence, in 1950, with its victory in the French men's team championship. (Jean Borotra, Jacques Carot, Roland Delarue, Roger Dubuc, Georges Glasser, Gil de Kermadec, Bernard Lucot). During the winter, the club's facilities were used for important tournaments such as the Tournoi de la Toussaint, the Coupe Canet or the French International Championships on covered courts. We could see the greatest players of that time playing on our courts as well as on the Coubertin central court: Patty, Drobny, Larsen, Ulrich... This era is now over. The facilities of the Coubertin Stadium are no longer large enough to ensure sufficient revenue for professional players in search of dollars. Pierre Candeliez died prematurely in 1951, and Georges Glasser took over the presidency until 1965.

from 1965 to the present day 
The TCP men's first team won the French team championship in 1987, more than 37 years after their first title. For the men's team, this was their second and last title, as the following year, it was the club's girls who won their first title in the women's championship. This title was held until 1990, when it was relinquished to the Basque Coast club. It was not until 13 years later that a TC Paris team reached the final of the championship and lost 6–2 to TC Thionville in Toulouse.

The men's team lost the 2012 championship final 4–0 to Villa Primrose, a Bordeaux club that had been waiting for a title for over a hundred years. After a surprise defeat by the small club TC Quimperlé in the final the following year, the Parisian club was crowned French Champion in 2014 for its third consecutive final against TC Lille, winning 4–2 in the final after having swept Sarcelles in the semi-final, despite being the arch-favourite this year.

Presidents 

 1895 - 1923 Paul Lecaron
 1924 - 1930 Albert Canet
 1931 - 1941 Jean Borotra
 1942 - 1951 Pierre Candeliez
 1952 - 1965 Georges Glasser
 1966 - 1974 Gabriel Guy
 1975 - 1985 Jacques Carot
 1986 - 1986 Dominique Droulers
 1987 - 1992 Jean-Pierre Courcol
 1993 - 1995 Alain Pfirter
 1996 - 1999 Philippe Seghers
 2000 - 2004 Michel Leclercq
 2005 - ... Jean-François Alcan

Achievements 

 French men's team champion (3) :
 Winner in 1950, 1987 and 2014
 Finalist in 2012, 2013 and 2015
 French women's team champion (5):
 Winner in 1927, 1988, 1989, 1990 and 2015

TCP sports facilities 
Tennis, winter configuration :

 6 covered Green Set courts
 8 indoor clay courts
 3 outdoor green set courts
 1 outdoor clay court

Tennis, Summer configuration :

 7 outdoor clay courts
 3 outdoor Green Set courts
 2 indoor clay courts
 6 indoor Green Set courts
 1 covered wooden court

Outdoor swimming pool

Sports hall

 Gym area
 Cardio area
 Weight training area

Notable players

Men

 Robert Abdesselam
 Paul Aymé
 Julien Benneteau
 Marcel Bernard
 Jean Borotra
 Christian Boussus
 Jacques Brugnon
 Albert Canet
 Thierry Champion
 Andrei Chesnokov
 Max Decugis
 Bernard Destremau
 Georges Gault
 Richard Gasquet
 Augustin Gensse
 Maurice Germot
 André Gobert
 Sébastien Grosjean
 Jérôme Haehnel
 Paul Lebreton
 Alexandre Sidorenko
 Jo-Wilfried Tsonga
 André Vacherot
 Michel Vacherot
 Stanislas Wawrinka
 Eric Winogradsky

Women

 Sophie Amiach
 Amélie Cocheteux
 Alexia Dechaume
 Stéphanie Foretz
 Nathalie Herreman
 Émilie Loit
 Amélie Mauresmo
 Pauline Parmentier
 Marie-Ève Pelletier
 Dally Randriantefy
 Olivia Sanchez
 Anne-Marie Seghers
 Anne-Gaëlle Sidot
 Sandrine Testud
 Nathalie Vierin

Presidents

 1895 - 1923  Paul Lecaron
 1923 - 1930  Albert Canet
 1930 - 1941  Jean Borotra
 1941 - 1951  Pierre Candeliez
 1951 - 1965  Georges Glasser
 1965 - 1974  Gabriel Guy
 1974 - 1985  Jacques Carot
 1986 - 1986  Dominique Droulers
 1987 - 1992  Jean-Pierre Courcol
 1992 - 1995  Alain Pfirter
 1995 - 1999  Philippe Seghers
 1999 - 2004  Michel Leclercq
 2004 - ...   Jean-François Alcan

References

External links
 Official site:http://www.tennisclubdeparis.fr/
 Club history:http://www.tcpretro.fr/

Tennis in France
Sports venues in Paris
Tennis in Paris
16th arrondissement of Paris
Sports clubs in Paris
1895 establishments in France
Sports venues completed in 1895
Tennis clubs